Steve Kaplan (סטיב קפלן) is an American-Israeli former basketball player, who played 14 seasons in the Israel Basketball Premier League. He played the forward position. He is 8th all-time in career points in the league.

Early and personal life
Kaplan is Jewish, and has dual American-Israeli citizenship. He grew up in Collingswood, New Jersey and played prep basketball at Collingswood High School. He is 6' 6" (198 cm) tall. He served in the Israel Defense Forces, moved to Ramat Gan, Israel, and is married to Israeli-born Irit Kaplan.  His son Tom Kaplan played for the Israel 17-under national basketball team, and attended Monmouth University.

Basketball career
Kaplan played basketball for Team USA in the 1969 Maccabiah Games, and for Team Israel in the 1977 Maccabiah Games.

He attended Rutgers University-New Brunswick ('72). Kaplan was captain of the Rutgers basketball team in his senior year. In his Rutgers career, he averaged 16.4 points and 7.6 rebounds per game, with a 18.2 field goal percentage and an 88.8 free throw percentage (the second-highest in school history). His .927 free throw percentage in 1989-90 is the highest in Rutgers history.

Kaplan played 14 seasons of professional basketball in Israel with Hapoel Ramat Gan, in the Israel Basketball Premier League. He is 8th all-time in career points in the league, with 5,913.

He also played on the Israeli national basketball team, and competed in EuroBasket 1979.

After his basketball career, Kaplan became the director of logistics for a chemical company.

References 

American expatriate basketball people in Israel
American men's basketball players
Basketball players at the 1969 Maccabiah Games
Basketball players from New Jersey
Collingswood High School alumni
Competitors at the 1977 Maccabiah Games
Israeli Basketball Premier League players
Jewish American sportspeople
Jewish men's basketball players
Maccabiah Games basketball players of Israel
Maccabiah Games basketball players of the United States
People from Collingswood, New Jersey
Rutgers Scarlet Knights men's basketball players
Sportspeople from Camden County, New Jersey
Maccabiah Games silver medalists for Israel